Krymsky Val is a street in the Yakimanka District of Moscow, near Gorky Park. Also near are Krymsky Bridge, Fallen Monument Park, and the Tretyakov Gallery.

Moscow Metro stations nearby are Park Kultury and Oktyabrskaya.

See also

 Garden Ring
 Kaluzhskaya Square
 MAHL RAH

References

External links and reference

 Reference to the Treyakov

Streets in Moscow